Lori A. Clarke is an American computer scientist noted for her research on software engineering.

Biography
Clarke received a B.A. in Mathematics  from the University of Rochester in 1969. She received a Ph.D in Computer Science from the  University of Colorado in 1976.

She then joined the Department of Computer Science at the University of Massachusetts Amherst as an assistant professor in 1976. While there she was promoted to associate professor in 1981 and to professor in 1986. In 2011, she became the chair of the School of Computer Science. In 2015 she became an emeritus professor.

She was a board member for SIGSOFT from 1985 to 2001, including the chair from 1993 to 1997. She was a board member of CRA from 1999 to 2009. She is also noted for her leadership in broadening participation in computing. She has been a member of the CRA-W Board since 2001 and was the co-chair of CRA-W from 2005 to 2008.

Awards
In the year 1998 she was named an ACM Fellow.

Her other notable awards include:
 IEEE Fellow in 2011 for contributions to software testing and verification.

 ACM SIGSOFT Outstanding Research Award, 2011

 ACM SIGSOFT Distinguished Service Award, 2002

References

External links
 University of Massachusetts Amherst: Lori A. Clarke, Department of Computer Science

Living people
American computer scientists
American women computer scientists
University of Massachusetts Amherst faculty
Fellows of the Association for Computing Machinery
Fellow Members of the IEEE
Year of birth missing (living people)
21st-century American women